Blazon Stone is the sixth album by German heavy metal band Running Wild, released in 1991. According to Rolf Kasparek in an interview to a Brazilian heavy metal/hard rock magazine (Roadie Crew, ed. #41, June 2002), Blazon Stone is the best-selling album by the band, in the 1990s. It is also their first album with both guitarist Axel Morgan and drummer AC.

Track listing 
All tracks written by Rolf Kasparek except where noted

Notes 
 1st press CD release and Polish pressings features the three bonus tracks "Over the Rainbow", "Billy the Kid" and a cover version of the Thin Lizzy song "Genocide". Later CD releases feature one or two bonus tracks
 The 1995 re-release includes the song "Dancing on a Minefield", which is also featured as a bonus track on the 1994 album Black Hand Inn
 The 2017 remastered release features all bonus tracks (excluding "Dancing on a Minefield"), plus the 2003 re-recorded versions of "Blazon Stone" and "Little Big Horn"

Personnel 
 Rolf Kasparek – vocals,  guitar
 Axel Morgan – guitars
 Jens Becker – bass
 Rüdiger "AC" Dreffein – drums

Additional Musicians
 Kalle Bösel – backing vocals
 Jan Olav, Martina Wiegendt, Sven Pöschmann, Michael Herwig, Jens Butterwick, Raymond Kana, Oliver Losshagen and Ladislav Křížek – backing vocals on "Little Big Horn" and "Heads or Tails"

Production
 Jan Němec – engineer, mixing
 Karl-Ulrich Walterbach – executive producer
 Thorsten Herbig – photography
 Rock 'n' Rolf – producer
 Andreas Marschall – pover art (front and back covers)
 Horst Herrndorff – pover art (back cover)

Charts

References 

1991 albums
Running Wild (band) albums
Noise Records albums